The National Junior Art Honor Society (NJAHS) was established in the United States  in 1989  by the National Art Education Association (NEAE) for middle school students in grades 6-8. Its purpose is to help recognize and inspire interested students to do more with their creative ability. It also motivates students to join the National Art Honor Society in high school.

Members of this honor society can submit their own artwork for the NAHS/NJAHS Juried Exhibition at the NAEA Studio & Gallery and can also be published in NAHS News. Students also gain leadership opportunities and overall growth, which can help them with preparation for other responsibilities later in life.

References

External links 
 

1989 establishments in the United States
Visual arts education
Art societies
Organizations established in 1989